Wenche Bryn Lowzow (27 May 1926 – 24 September 2016) was a Norwegian politician in the Conservative Party of Norway. She was a member of the Norwegian parliament as a representative from Oslo from 1977 to 1985. When same-sex civil unions were accepted by Norwegian law in 1993, Lowzow and her partner, author and activist Karen-Christine Friele, were among the first to formalize their relationship.

Lowzow died on 24 September 2016 at the age of 90.

References

1926 births
2016 deaths
Members of the Storting
Norwegian LGBT rights activists
Norwegian LGBT politicians
Conservative Party (Norway) politicians
Women members of the Storting
20th-century Norwegian politicians
20th-century Norwegian women politicians
LGBT conservatism